Maclay is a planned light rail station on the Los Angeles County Metro Rail system. The station is part of the East San Fernando Light Rail Project. It is located on North Maclay Avenue near the intersection with Truman Street in San Fernando, California. Metrolink Antelope Valley Line trains pass but will not stop here. It is planned to open as part of the second phase of the project.

References

Future Los Angeles Metro Rail stations
San Fernando, California